The Church of St James in Preston Plucknett, Somerset, England, was built in 1420. It is a Grade II* listed building.

History

The church was built in 1420 with substantial Victorian restoration in the 19th century. The church which had been funded by John Stourton was consecrated in 1443.

A vestry was added in the 1950s and an annexe in 1979, which was expanded in 2001.

It became a separate parish church in 1988: until that time, it had been a church of St John's, the parish church of Yeovil.

The parish and benefice of Preston Plucknett is within the Diocese of Bath and Wells.

Architecture

The hamstone building has clay tile roofs. It is supported by diagonal buttresses, and contains six bells.

In the churchyard is a 15th-century cross, however the head of the cross with three figures on it is now stored in a glass case within the church itself.

See also
 List of ecclesiastical parishes in the Diocese of Bath and Wells

References

Grade II* listed buildings in South Somerset
Grade II* listed churches in Somerset
Church of England church buildings in South Somerset